Martina Hingis and Sania Mirza were the defending champions, but chose not to participate together. Hingis played alongside CoCo Vandeweghe, but lost in the second round to Julia Görges and Karolína Plíšková. Mirza teamed up with Barbora Strýcová, but lost in the second round to Gabriela Dabrowski and María José Martínez Sánchez.

Bethanie Mattek-Sands and Lucie Šafářová won the title, defeating Caroline Garcia and Kristina Mladenovic in the final, 6−4, 6−4.

Seeds
The top four seeds received a bye into the second round.

Draw

Finals

Top half

Bottom half

References
 Main Draw

Womens Doubles